Dave Stewart is a retired American soccer forward who spent his career with the El Paso Patriots in the USISL.  He played for El Paso from 1993 to at least 1999.  On August 27, 1995, Stewart and his teammates fell to the Richmond Kickers in the final of the 1995 U.S. Open Cup.  On February 2, 1997, the MetroStars selected Heald in the third round (twenty-fifth overall) of the 1997 MLS Supplemental Draft.  When the MetroStars released him in April, he returned to the Patriots.

References

Living people
American soccer players
El Paso Patriots players
USISL players
USL Second Division players
USISL Select League players
A-League (1995–2004) players
New York Red Bulls draft picks
Place of birth missing (living people)
Association football forwards
Year of birth missing (living people)